Call Me Thief is a 2016 South African crime film directed by Daryne Joshua. It was selected as the South African entry for the Best Foreign Language Film at the 89th Academy Awards, but it was not nominated. It is based on the life of the film's writer, John W. Fredericks.

Cast
 Dann-Jacques Mouton as Abraham 'AB' Lonzi
 Christian Bennett as Tyrone 'Gif' Felix
 Gantane Kusch as Richard 'Gimba' Carelse
 Gershwin Mias as Martin 'Shorty' Jacobs
 Sandi Schultz as Kettie Lonzi, AB's mother
 Charlton George as Phillip Lonzi, AB's father
 Tarryn Wyngaard as Jenny; AB's love interest
 Lauren Joseph as Gloria Lonzi; AB's younger sister
 Simone Biscombe as Frances Lonzi; AB's older sister
 Denise Newman as Mrs. Lubbe; the Lonzis' next door neighbor
 Abduragman Adams as Mr. Carelse; Gimba's father, leader of the 26's gang
 Jill Levenberg as Celia; Gif's aunt
 Louw Venter as Officer Koegedam

See also
 List of submissions to the 89th Academy Awards for Best Foreign Language Film
 List of South African submissions for the Academy Award for Best Foreign Language Film

References

External links
 

2016 films
2016 crime films
South African crime films
Afrikaans-language films